USS LST-19 was a United States Navy  used exclusively in the Asiatic-Pacific Theater during World War II and manned by a United States Coast Guard crew. Like many of her class, she was not named and is properly referred to by her hull designation.

Construction
LST-19 was laid down on 22 October 1942, at Pittsburgh, Pennsylvania by the Dravo Corporation; launched on 11 March 1943; sponsored by Mrs. Frances P. Gott. She was floated down the Ohio and Mississippi rivers and entered commissioned service on 15 May 1943.

Service history  
During World War II, LST-19 was assigned to the Asiatic-Pacific theater. From 1–17 July 1943, she was on the California coast en route to Alaska. On 17 July 1943, she was underway out of San Francisco Bay, arriving at the Naval Air Station, Woman's Bay, Kodiak, Alaska on 25 July 1943. Here the Army personnel were disembarked and LCT-81 launched. Beaching exercises were carried out. Practice operations were continued, some in Great Sitkin Island area and cargo was unloaded at Sweeper's Cove. Departing Adak on 14 August 1943, LST-19 took position in a convoy operating with Task Force 16.10. On 16 August, she broke off and proceeded independently, anchoring off Kiska Island. She then entered Kiska Harbor on 19 August, and began unloading Army equipment. She departed for San Francisco, on 31 August 1943, but turned back to Adak due to engine problems.

LST-19 was at San Pedro, on 4 April 1944. Proceeding to San Diego and San Francisco, she departed for Pearl Harbor, on 3 May 1944. Proceeding by way of Saipan and Eniwetok LST-19 arrived at Peleliu on D-1 day, 14 September 1944, and was also engaged in the raids on Volocano-Bonia and Yap. She returned to Peleliu and Angaur on 24 December 1944. On 31 December, she was at Fais Island, returning to Peleliu on 15 January 1945.
LST-19 arrived at Kossol, on 4 February 1945, and Ulithi on 11 February. She departed Ulithi, on 5 March, for San Francisco via Eniwetok, Pearl Harbor, San Pedro and San Diego, arriving on 28 July 1945. On 5 August 1945, she departed San Francisco for Pearl Harbor, returning on 3 September 1945.

LST-19 was redesignated as LST(H)-19 on 15 September 1945. Again departing San Francisco, on 25 September 1945, she proceeded to Wakayama, Japan, via Pearl Harbor and Buckner Bay, Okinawa, arriving there on 5 November 1945. She returned to San Francisco, in January 1946, via Saipan and Pearl Harbor. She then sailed for Charleston, South Carolina, via the Canal Zone, on 18 January 1946, arriving at Charleston on 14 February 1946.

Post-war decommissioning  
She was decommissioned and her Coast Guard crew removed on 20 March 1946. She was struck from the Navy List on 1 May 1946. On 5 December 1947, she was sold to Ships and Power Equipment Co., of Barber, New Jersey, for scrapping.

Awards  
LST-19 earned four battle stars for World War II service.

See also 
 Landing craft
 List of United States Navy LSTs

References

Bibliography

External links

 

World War II amphibious warfare vessels of the United States
Ships built in Pittsburgh
1943 ships
LST-1-class tank landing ships of the United States Navy
United States Navy ships crewed by the United States Coast Guard
Ships built by Dravo Corporation